Néstor Osvaldo Perlongher (Avellaneda, 25 December 1949 - São Paulo, 26 November 1992)  was an Argentine poet and anthropologist.

He graduated and completed his degree in sociology; he moved to São Paulo, where he graduated from the University of Campinas with a Master of Social Anthropology; where he was appointed professor in 1985.

His work appeared in the El Porteño, Alfonsina, Last Kingdom and Poetry Journal. 
He was active in the Frente de Liberación Homosexual.
He died of AIDS in São Paulo.

Awards
1993 Guggenheim Fellowship.

Works
 Austria-Hungría (Buenos Aires, Tierra Baldía, 1980).
 Alambres (Buenos Aires, Último Reino, 1987; Premio "Boris Vian" de Literatura Argentina).
 Hule (Buenos Aires, Último Reino, 1989) .
 Parque Lezama (Buenos Aires, Sudamericana, 1990).
 Aguas aéreas (Buenos Aires, Último Reino, 1990).
 El chorreo de las iluminaciones (Caracas, Pequeña Venecia, 1992).
Poemas completos: 1980-1992, Buenos Aires: Planeta, 1997; Grupo Editorial Planeta S.A.I.C./Seix Barral, 2003, .

Non-fiction
Prosa plebeya, Editors Christian Ferrer, Osvaldo Baigorria, Ediciones Colihue SRL, 1997, .
Papeles insumisos, Editor Reynaldo Jiménez, Santiago Arcos, 2004, .
El negocio del deseo: la prostitución masculina en San Pablo, Paidós, 1999, .
La prostitución masculina, Ediciones de la Urraca, 1993, .
El Fantasma del SIDA, Puntosur, 1988.

References

Sources
Néstor Perlongher: the poetic search for an Argentine marginal voice, Ben Bollig, University of Wales Press, 2008, .
Bollig, Ben "Nestor Perlongher and the Avant-Garde: Privileged Interlocuters and Inherited Techniques", Hispanic Review - Volume 73, Number 2, Spring 2005, pp. 157–184.
The art of transition: Latin American culture and neoliberal crisis, Francine Masiello, Duke University Press, 2001, .

External links
Materials about Néstor Osvaldo Perlongher in the Néstor Perlongher Letters to Martha "Beba" Eguía and Ricardo                           Piglia held by Princeton University Library Special Collections

1949 births
1992 deaths
Argentine male poets
Gay poets
Social anthropologists
Argentine LGBT rights activists
Argentine LGBT poets
Academic staff of the State University of Campinas
AIDS-related deaths in São Paulo (state)
20th-century Argentine poets
20th-century Argentine male writers
LGBT academics
20th-century Argentine LGBT people